Bernard Andrieu (born 24 December 1959 in Agen) is a French philosopher and historian of the body.

Biography
Andrieu was born on 24 December 1959 in Agen. He studied in Bordeaux from 1978 to 1984.  He is a professor at the University of Nancy.
He has written on the philosophy of neuroscience and the mind-body problem, as well as the history of bodily practices such as tanning, touch, the open air, and immersion. He is the editor of a 450-article Dictionary of the Body.<ref>Alexandre Giroux, [http://www.alexandragiroux.net/le-dictionnaire-du-corps-supervised-by-bernard-andrieu-professeur/ Le Dictionnaire du Corps] </ref>

Works
 La neurophilosophie, Paris: Presses Universitaires de France, 1998
 Les cultes du corps: éthique et sciences, Paris: Éd. l'Harmattan, 1994
 (ed.) Le Dictionnaire du Corps: en sciences humaines et sociales'', 2006

References

External links
 Le site du corps
 
 Official website of the European Association for the Philosophy of Sport (EAPS)
 

People from Agen
1959 births
Living people
20th-century French philosophers
21st-century French philosophers
Historians of science
Academic staff of Nancy-Université
French male non-fiction writers
Philosophers of sport